Birley Hay is a hamlet in North East Derbyshire in the county of Derbyshire in England.

Location
Birley Hay lies just south of the South Yorkshire border, around 5 miles south-east of Sheffield City Centre, and just a mile south of the village of Ridgeway

History
The hamlet alongside Ridgeway village is estimated to be around 700-800 years old, and would once have been part of Sherwood Forest.

Birley Hay was associated largely with the sickle smithing trade in the area, with a large grinding wheel existing on The Moss. 

Today Birley Hay and the nearby hamlet of Ford, Derbyshire are considered to be part of Ridgeway, Derbyshire however this only seems to be the case for the last century, as the hamlets are clearly displayed on survey maps from the late 1800s.

Most of the buildings in the hamlet are Grade-II listed, this includes Birley Hay Farmhouses.

See also
Listed buildings in Eckington, Derbyshire

References

External links
Ridgeway Birley Hay history

Hamlets in Derbyshire
Eckington, Derbyshire